Athens Downtown Historic District is a registered historic district in Athens, Ohio, listed in the National Register on September 30, 1982.  It contains 88 contributing buildings, made from an assortment of materials.

The architecture is in the style of Late Victorian with periods of significance from 1900–1924, 1875–1899, and 1850–1874.  The downtown district is currently being used for Commerce / Trade, Domestic, Education, and Government.

The district has a number of contiguous contributing buildings, many with brick facades, bracketed cornices, and decorative arched stone lintels.

Historic uses 
College
Manufacturing Facility
Extractive Facility

References 

Historic districts on the National Register of Historic Places in Ohio
Geography of Athens County, Ohio
National Register of Historic Places in Athens County, Ohio
Athens, Ohio